Acrossocheilus rendahli is a species of ray-finned fish in the genus Acrossocheilus from southern China and northern Vietnam.

References

Rendahli
Fish described in 1931